Acacallis (Ancient Greek: Ἀκακαλλίς means 'unwalled') in Greek mythology, was princess of Crete. The Bibliotheca calls her Acalle (Ἀκάλλη).

Family 
Acacallis was the daughter of Minos, king of Crete, and Pasiphae the daughter of Helios, or Crete the daughter of Asterion. She was the sister of Ariadne, Androgeus, Deucalion, Phaedra, Glaucus, Catreus and Xenodice.

According to a Cretan mythological tradition, she bore a son to Hermes, Cydon, the founder of Cydonia. Other traditions give Cydon as the offspring of Acacallis and Apollo, and thus, brother to Oaxes. Yet others wrote that Acacallis mothered Cydon with Hermes, and Naxos (eponym of the island Naxos) with Apollo.

Another tradition relates that Acacallis and Apollo had a son named Miletus. Still other traditions relate that another son was born of her and Apollo, named Amphithemis or Garamas (in some stories, the first mortal born). Lastly by Apollo, she was also said to be the mother of Phylacides and Phylander.

Mythology 
Fearing her father's wrath, she exposed her son Miletus, but Apollo commanded she-wolves to nurse it until it could be taken in and raised by shepherds. He grew up strong and handsome, and Minos was seized with desire for the boy. Miletus fled Crete to avoid being becoming the eromenos of the king, and went on to found the eponymous city, Miletus.

Pausanias relates that when Apollo came to Carmanor to be cleansed for the murder of Python, he mated with Acacallis (said to be a nymph in this particular version), and that from their union were born Phylacides and Phylander. People of the Cretan city Elyrus sent to Delphi a bronze statue of a goat suckling these two children, which suggests that they must have been abandoned by their mother.

Acacallis was in Crete a common name for a narcissus.

Notes

References 

Antoninus Liberalis, The Metamorphoses of Antoninus Liberalis translated by Francis Celoria (Routledge 1992). Online version at the Topos Text Project.
Apollodorus, The Library with an English Translation by Sir James George Frazer, F.B.A., F.R.S. in 2 Volumes, Cambridge, MA, Harvard University Press; London, William Heinemann Ltd. 1921. ISBN 0-674-99135-4. Online version at the Perseus Digital Library. Greek text available from the same website.
Apollonius Rhodius, Argonautica translated by Robert Cooper Seaton (1853-1915), R. C. Loeb Classical Library Volume 001. London, William Heinemann Ltd, 1912. Online version at the Topos Text Project.
Bell, Robert E., Women of Classical Mythology: A Biographical Dictionary. ABC-Clio. 1991. .
Graves, Robert, The Greek Myths, Harmondsworth, London, England, Penguin Books, 1960. 
Graves, Robert, The Greek Myths: The Complete and Definitive Edition. Penguin Books Limited. 2017. 
Maurus Servius Honoratus, In Vergilii carmina comentarii. Servii Grammatici qui feruntur in Vergilii carmina commentarii; recensuerunt Georgius Thilo et Hermannus Hagen. Georgius Thilo. Leipzig. B. G. Teubner. 1881. Online version at the Perseus Digital Library.
Pausanias, Description of Greece with an English Translation by W.H.S. Jones, Litt.D., and H.A. Ormerod, M.A., in 4 Volumes. Cambridge, MA, Harvard University Press; London, William Heinemann Ltd. 1918. . Online version at the Perseus Digital Library
Pausanias, Graeciae Descriptio. 3 vols. Leipzig, Teubner. 1903.  Greek text available at the Perseus Digital Library.
Stephanus of Byzantium, Stephani Byzantii Ethnicorum quae supersunt, edited by August Meineike (1790-1870), published 1849. A few entries from this important ancient handbook of place names have been translated by Brady Kiesling. Online version at the Topos Text Project.

Princesses in Greek mythology
Agenorides
Women of Apollo
Cretan women
Cretan characters in Greek mythology